Members of the New South Wales Legislative Council between 1961 and 1964 were indirectly elected by a joint sitting of the New South Wales Parliament, with 15 members elected every three years. The most recent election was on 16 March 1961, with the term of new members commencing on 23 April 1961. The President was William Dickson.

See also
Fourth Cahill ministry
First Heffron ministry
Second Heffron ministry

References

Members of New South Wales parliaments by term
20th-century Australian politicians